Cooraclare is a village near Kilrush, in County Clare, Ireland, and a Catholic parish by the same name.

Location
The village of Cooraclare is in the parish of Cooraclare (Kilmacduane) in the Roman Catholic Diocese of Killaloe.
The old name for the parish is Kilmacduane, which was joined for a while to the parish of Kilmihil. In 1848 the two were again separated and Cooraclare took its present name. The parish includes the village of Cree, at times spelled Creegh.

The parish has two churches, St Senan's in Cooraclare and St Mary's in Cree.

Cooraclare lies on the River Doonbeg.

Sport and culture
Cooraclare have won the Clare Senior Football Championship in 1915, 1917, 1918, 1925, 1944, 1956, 1964, 1965, 1986 and 1997, and also hosts the Rose of Clare Festival every year in August.

A song associated with Cooraclare is entitled "The Chapel Gate of Cooraclare".

People

Famous natives or residents include:
Brendan Daly, politician and former government minister
Seán Kinsella, chef who was born in Cooraclare
Mick Lillis, Gaelic footballer for Laois and - later - manager
Tom Morrissey, Gaelic footballer for Clare
The D'Arcys Brothers, who were active in the War of Independence. In 2023 a monument was erected to their memory in Cooraclare Village which is known as "D'Arcy's Remembered"
Michael D'Arcy who died age 22 at Poulmore Cooraclare whilst taking part in an ambush of the Cooraclare RIC. 
Patrick D'Arcy who was an active Volunteer & later executed aged 25 in nearby Doonbeg.
Jack D'Arcy who was sentenced to death but evaded British custody enroute to Limerick Gaol.

See also

 List of towns and villages in Ireland

References

Towns and villages in County Clare
Parishes of the Roman Catholic Diocese of Killaloe